Kaipara may refer to:
Kaipara Flats, a locality in the Rodney District of New Zealand
Kaipara (New Zealand electorate), a former Parliamentary electorate 
Kaipara District, a local government division in New Zealand
Kaipara Harbour, in northern New Zealand
Kaipara River, in northern New Zealand